Abū Nasr Muhammad ibn al-Nāsir (1175 – 11 July 1226), better known with his regnal name al-Zāhir bi-Amr Allāh, was the Abbasid caliph in Baghdad from 1225 to 1226. He succeeded his father al-Nasir in the year 1225 as the thirty-fifth Abbasid Caliph.

Biography
Al-Zahir bi-Amr Allah was the son of al-Nasir and Asma Umm Muhammad. His full name was Muhammad ibn Ahmad al-Nāsir and his Kunya was Abu Nasr He was named as successor in 1189. In his short reign, he lowered the taxes, and built a strong army to resist invasions. He died on 10 July 1226, nine months after his accession.

Al-Nasir was the Abbasid Caliph from 1180 until his death in 1225. His father attempted to restore the caliphate to its ancient dominant role. According to the historian, Angelika Hartmann, al-Nasir was the last effective Abbasid Caliph.

Mongol invasion of Khwarezmia
When it became known that Genghis Khan was marching towards Khwarazm, Jalal al-Din proposed to his father to meet the Mongols in one decisive battle near the Syr Darya. However, Muhammad II relied on his well-fortified fortresses and did not assemble troops, distributing them instead among the major towns of his empire. Meanwhile, the Mongols swiftly took one city after another. At the beginning of 1220, Bukhara fell, followed by Samarqand. Muhammad started to retreat west, and after a series of unsuccessful battles, was left with a handful of soldiers and his sons. The huge and undisciplined Khwarazmian army was unable to defeat the enemy, which was much inferior in number.

Legend has it that Muhammad, who fled to the Caspian Sea, being terminally ill, gathered his sons: Jalal ad-Din, Aqshah, and Uzlagh Khan and announced that he appointed Jalal ad-Din as heir to the throne, because only he could confront the enemy. Summoning the younger sons to obedience, he hung his sword on the belt of Jalal ad-Din. A few days later, Muhammad died and Jalal ad-Din was proclaimed a Khwarazmshah.

Following the defeat of his father, Ala ad-Din Muhammad II by Genghis Khan in 1220, Jalal ad-Din Mingburnu came to power and retreated with the remaining Khwarazm forces, while pursued by a Mongol army and at the Battle of Parwan, north of Kabul, defeated the Mongols.

Due to the Mongol invasion, the sacking of Samarkand and being deserted by his Afghan allies, Jalal ad-Din was forced to flee to India. At the Indus River, however, the Mongols caught up with him and slaughtered his forces, along with thousands of refugees, at the Battle of the Indus. He escaped and sought asylum in the Sultanate of Delhi but Iltutmish denied this to him in deference to the relationship with the Abbasid caliphs. The cities of Herat, Ghazni and Merv were destroyed and massacred by the Mongols, for his resistance or rebelliousness.

Family
One of al-Zahir's concubines was Hayat Khatun. She was of Turkish origin, a favored and trusted concubine, and the mother of one of his sons. She was manumitted upon his death and became 
a free woman. She died on 16 August 1241, and was buried in the mausoleum of the caliph al-Mustadi. Another of his concubines was Bab Jawhar. She was a Turkish slave who was also a favorite of al-Zahir. She died on 1 August 1241, and was buried near the caliphal tombs in the Rusafah Cemetery. Another of his concubines was a Turkish slave. She was the mother of the future Caliph al-Mustansir.

Succession 
Al-Zahir was succeeded by al-Mustansir bi-llah.

See also
 Al-Sarai Mosque built by his father al-Nasir.
 Zumurrud Khatun Mosque and Mausoleum was built by his grandmother.
 Mausoleum of Umar Suhrawardi
 Muhammad bin Hasan al-Baghdadi

References 

 This text is adapted from William Muir's public domain, The Caliphate: Its Rise, Decline, and Fall.

1170s births
1226 deaths
13th-century Abbasid caliphs
Sons of Abbasid caliphs